Most Welcome 2 is a Bangladeshi 2014 action film written by and directed by Ananta Jalil. Development began in February 2012. The film is a sequel of 2012 blockbuster Most Welcome, The film released in 2014. The film stars Ananta Jalil and Barsha in leading roles.

Cast
 Ananta Jalil as police officer Aryan
 Afiea Nusrat Barsha as Adhora 
 Champa as Adhoras'  Mother
 Sohel Rana as Bangladeshi scientist Hasan Moin Khan
 Misha Sawdagor as main villain
 Parveen Sultana Diti as police officer Aryan's Mother
 Puja Cherry Roy as police officer Aryan's Sister

Production
Following the success of the previous installments, producers planned to develop a second sequel to the franchise, with Ananta Jalil playing the protagonist again. The shooting of the film started on 9 February 2013.

Release
Most Welcome 2 released only in 19 theaters in Dhaka, but after second week it was released in 62 screens nationwide. It had also a limited release in Japan and UK.

Soundtrack

See also
 List of Bangladeshi films of 2014

References

External links
 
 

2014 films
2014 3D films
2014 action films
Bengali-language Bangladeshi films
Bangladeshi action films
2010s superhero films
Films scored by Akassh
Bangladeshi sequel films
Films directed by Ananta Jalil
2010s Bengali-language films
Monsoon Films films